Max Knoll  (17 July 1897 – 6 November 1969) was a German electrical engineer.

Knoll was born in Wiesbaden and studied in Munich and at the Technical University of Berlin, where he obtained his doctorate in the Institute for High Voltage Technology. In 1927 he became the leader of the electron research group there, where he and his co-worker, Ernst Ruska, invented the electron microscope in 1931. In April 1932, Knoll joined Telefunken in Berlin to do developmental work in the field of television design. He was also a private lecturer in Berlin.

After World War II, Knoll joined the University of Munich as extraordinary professor and director of the Institute for Electromedicine. He moved to the USA in 1948, to  work at the Department of Electrical Engineering at Princeton University.

In 1956 he returned to Munich and engaged in a series of experiments at the Technische Hochschule, involving the generation of phosphenes by electrically stimulating the brains of himself and other subjects. He retired in 1966.

See also
Scanning electron microscope
Transmission electron microscopy

References
 Knoll, Max & Kügler, J. (1959). "Subjective Light Pattern Spectroscopy in the Electroencephalic Range". Nature (London) 184:1823–1824.

1897 births
1969 deaths
Engineering educators
German electrical engineers
Knoll, Max
Academic staff of the Ludwig Maximilian University of Munich
Microscopists
Princeton University faculty
Technical University of Munich alumni
Academic staff of the Technical University of Munich
Technical University of Berlin alumni
Scientists from Wiesbaden
Engineers from Hesse